Sir John Michael Brady (born 30 April 1945)  is an Emeritus professor of Oncological Imaging at the University of Oxford. He has been a Fellow of Keble College, Oxford since 1985 and was elected a foreign associate member of the French Academy of Sciences in 2015. He was formerly BP Professor of Information Engineering at Oxford from 1985 to 2010 and a Senior Research Scientist in the MIT Computer Science and Artificial Intelligence Laboratory (CSAIL) in Cambridge, Massachusetts, from 1980 to 1985.

Education
Brady was educated in the School of Mathematics at the University of Manchester, where he was awarded a first class Bachelor of Science degree in mathematics in 1966 followed by a Master of Science degree in 1968. He went on to study at the Australian National University, where he was awarded a Doctor of Philosophy degree in 1970 for research into group theory supervised by László György Kovács.

Research and career
Brady is an authority in the field of image analysis, initially working on shape analysis while at MIT, then on robotics, but most of all with an emphasis on medical image analysis. At MIT he worked on: the multiscale representation of the bounding contours of shapes (the curvature primal sketch), with Haruo Asada (Toshiba); two dimensional shapes (smoothed local symmetries), with Jon Connell; and the application of differential geometry to three-dimensional data, with Jean Ponce and Demetri Terzopoulos. He also worked on texture with Alan Yuille. He also worked with John M. Hollerbach, Tomàs Lozano-Pérez, and Matt Mason on robotics, who together published an early influential collection of articles and founded a seminal series of conferences.

Arriving in Oxford in 1985, he established the Robotics Laboratory and recruited Andrew Blake, Andrew Zisserman, Stephen Cameron, Hugh Durrant-Whyte, Lionel Tarassenko, Alison Noble, and David Murray. His initial focus was on mobile robotics, where he worked closely with Huosheng Hu Jan Grothusen, Stephen Smith, Mark Jenkinson, and Ian Reid. This was a collaboration with GEC Electrical Products and led in 1991 to the formation of Guidance Navigation Systems Ltd.  The primary interest of this work was sensor data fusion and the real-time detection of obstacles in a robot vehicle's planned path, leading to a “slalom” manoeuvre to avoid it, or, if this was judged infeasible by the robot, a complete re-planning of the path to the goal.

Finishing a spell as head of engineering science (1989–84), Brady was awarded an EPSRC Senior Fellowship, during which he spent two year-long periods in the INRIA Laboratory headed by Nicholas Ayache.  Brady had begun to switch from robotics to medical imaging, specifically breast cancer, in 1989, following the death of his mother-in-law Dr. Irene Friedlander from the disease.  For the past 29 years he has worked with Ralph Highnam, first supervising Ralph's thesis, then co-authoring a monograph Mammographic Image Analysis, then co-founding Mirada Solutions Ltd and subsequently Volpara Health Technologies (ASX: VHT).  Together, they developed an influential mathematical model of the fluence of X-rays through the female breast as a basis for analysis of mammographic images. This work was done in collaboration with Ralph Highnam and pioneered an entirely novel “physics-based” approach. This attracted the interest of Nico Karssemeijer and led to further collaborations and the company ScreenPoint bv co-founded by Mike and Nico.

Brady is the Interim President of the worlds first Artificial Intelligence-based (AI) University: Mohamed bin Zayed University of Artificial Intelligence (MBZUAI), in Abu Dhabi, United Arab Emirates. 

Brady's work in image analysis, specifically medical image analysis, has been wide-ranging and he has contributed algorithms for image segmentation, image registration and feature detection. With Timor Kadir and Andrew Zisserman he introduced the influential Kadir–Brady saliency detector at the European Conference on Computer Vision in 2004. During his research career, Brady has supervised students including Alison Noble, David Forsyth, and Demetri Terzopoulos. 

Outside of academia, Brady has been involved with numerous start-up companies in the field of medical imaging including Matakina and ScreenPoint (mammographic image analysis), Mirada Medical (medical image fusion) and Perspectum Diagnostics (magnetic resonance imaging of the liver).

Awards and honours
Brady was elected a Fellow of the Royal Academy of Engineering (FREng) in 1992 and a Fellow of the Royal Society (FRS) in 1997. His FRS certificate of election reads: 

Brady was knighted in the 2004 New Year Honours for services to engineering. He delivered the Turing Lecture in 2009. He was also awarded the Faraday Medal from the Institution of Electrical Engineers (IEE) in 2000, the Millennium Medal from the Institute of Electrical and Electronics Engineers (IEEE) in 2000. He was elected a Fellow of the Academy of Medical Sciences (FMedSci) in 2008.  Brady was awarded Honorary Doctorates  at the University of Essex (1996), University of Manchester (1998) the University of Southampton(1999) the University of Liverpool (1999), the Paul Sabatier University (Toulouse) (2000), Oxford Brookes University (2006), the University of York, and Changsha and Chongqing. In 2007 he was appointed a commissioner of the Royal Commission for the Exhibition of 1851.

References

1945 births
Living people
Fellows of the Royal Society
Fellows of the Association for the Advancement of Artificial Intelligence
Fellows of the Academy of Medical Sciences (United Kingdom)
Fellows of the Royal Academy of Engineering
Members of the French Academy of Sciences